The Malta men's national tennis team represents Malta in Davis Cup tennis competition and are governed by the Malta Tennis Federation.

Malta currently compete in the Europe/Africa Zone of Group IV.

History
Malta competed in its first Davis Cup in 1986.

Current team (2022) 

 Liam Delicata
 Matthew Asciak
 Alex Degabriele (Junior player)
 Dwayne Lukas Pullicino (Junior player)

See also

Davis Cup
Malta Fed Cup team

External links

 Tennis Academy in Malta

Davis Cup teams
Davis Cup
Davis Cup